Es war ein Edelweiss is a march, with music and lyrics composed by Herms Niel in 1941 for the German Army.

Lyrics and Translation

See also 
 Nazi songs
 Erika (song)
 Königgrätzer Marsch
 Panzerlied

References

German military marches
German patriotic songs
Songs of World War II
1941 songs
Songs with music by Herms Niel